Igor Ivanovich Terekhov (born 21 February 1970) is a former Russian football player.

External links
 

1970 births
Living people
Soviet footballers
Russian footballers
FC Lokomotiv Moscow players
Russian Premier League players
Association football midfielders